Per Henriksen (born 10 April 1952) is a retired Norwegian footballer who played as a defender.

Honours

Norwegian First Division:
 1979, 1982

Norwegian Cup:
 1979

External links
 
 

1952 births
Living people
Norwegian footballers
Association football defenders
Viking FK players
Norway international footballers